Willie Brister (born January 28, 1952) is a former American football tight end. He played for the New York Jets from 1974 to 1975.

References

1952 births
Living people
American football tight ends
Southern Jaguars football players
New York Jets players